The British Academy Television Craft Award for Best Make-Up & Hair Design is one of the categories presented by the British Academy of Film and Television Arts (BAFTA) within the British Academy Television Craft Awards, the craft awards were established in 2000 with their own, separate ceremony as a way to spotlight technical achievements, without being overshadowed by the main production categories. According to the BAFTA website, the eligibility of this category is "limited to artists directly responsible for the make up and hair design in the programme."

It was awarded as Best Make-Up in 1978 and kept the name until 1999, since 2000 the category is presented as Best Make-Up & Hair Design.

Winners and nominees

1970s

1980s

1990s

2000s
Make-Up & Hair Design

2010s

2020s

See also
 Primetime Emmy Award for Outstanding Contemporary Hairstyling
 Primetime Emmy Award for Outstanding Makeup (Non-Prosthetic)
 Primetime Emmy Award for Outstanding Period and/or Character Hairstyling
 Primetime Emmy Award for Outstanding Period and/or Character Makeup (Non-Prosthetic)
 Primetime Emmy Award for Outstanding Prosthetic Makeup for a Series, Limited Series, Movie or Special

References

External links
 

Make-Up & Hair Design